The 1965 Tulsa Golden Hurricane football team represented the University of Tulsa during the 1965 NCAA University Division football season. In their fifth year under head coach Glenn Dobbs, the Golden Hurricane compiled an 8–3 record, 4–0 against Missouri Valley Conference opponents, and lost to Tennessee, 27–6 in the Bluebonnet Bowl. Under Glenn Dobbs, Tulsa led the nation in passing for five straight years from 1962 to 1966.

The 1965 team was led by record-setting performances from quarterback Billy Anderson and end Howard Twilley.  Anderson set five NCAA major college, single-season records with 3,464 passing yards, 3,343 yards of total offense (334.3 per game), 509 pass attempts, 296 completions, and 580 total offense plays. Twilley set eight new major college records, including 19 receptions in a game, 134 receptions in a season, 261 receptions in a career, five touchdown receptions in a game, 16 touchdown receptions in a season, 32 touchdown catches in a career, 1,779 receiving yards in a season, and 3,343 receiving yards in a career.  He also led the NCAA in 1965 with 121 points. Twilley was a consensus first-team All-American in 1965, went on to play 11 years in the National Football League and was inducted into the College Football Hall of Fame in 1992.

Schedule

References

Tulsa
Tulsa Golden Hurricane football seasons
Missouri Valley Conference football champion seasons
Tulsa Golden Hurricane football